Liwaa Yazji, alternative spelling Liwaa Yazaji, (born 1977 in Moscow, Soviet Union) is a Syrian filmmaker, playwright, TV screenwriter, dramaturge and poet. Her works, written in Arabic, have been translated into English and presented in the United Kingdom, the US and, in original Arabic versions, in Arab states.

Early life and education
Yazji was born to Syrian parents Haidar Yazaji (1946–2014), an artist, and Salwa Abdullah, who is a gynecologist and served as Minister of Social Affairs and Labour in the Syrian government from 2020 to 2021. Liwaa Yazji spent her early childhood years in Moscow, where her parents were completing their academic studies. The family returned to Syria in the early 1980s and stayed in the city of Aleppo for some years, before they moved to Damascus, where she finished her elementary, preparatory and secondary schooling. She then studied English Literature at Damascus University (1995–1998), and did her postgraduate diploma in Literary Studies (1998–1999). From 1999 to 2003, she was enrolled in Theater Studies at the Higher Institute for Dramatic Arts in Damascus.

Career 
Starting in 2003, she worked as a dramaturge and assistant director in several theater projects in Damascus. In 2007, she worked for the General Committee of the 2008 Arab Capital of Culture in Damascus, where she was in charge of programming Syrian theater and dance performances for the year's cultural program. After this, she was involved in creative writing projects for theater and TV, working as a scriptwriter for several pan-Arab production companies.

When the Syrian civil war broke out in 2011, she started to work on her first full-length documentary film Haunted, released in 2014. In 2016, she first moved to Beirut and then to Berlin. Since 2012, Yazji has also been a board member of the Syrian non-profit cultural organisation Ettijahat - Independent Culture.

Yazji's work is marked by her reflections about the cruelty of the war in Syria, her situation as a writer with family in Syria, who takes sides against this war, and by political and surrealist traditions of theater, such as that of Bertold Brecht and Edward Bond, whose play Saved she translated into Arabic in 2015.

Works
Here in the park

This was her first play, published in May 2012, although it was originally written between 2007 and 2009. It was published by Mamdouh Adwan Publishing House in Damascus.

In peace, we leave home

A poetry collection published in 2014 in Beirut, Lebanon. The poems in this collection were written during a span of several years before being published. A translation of three poems from this collection was published in English by CEC ArtsLink and The Martin E. Segal Theater in New York in 2017 after the author had been artist-in-residence at the Poets House in New York.

The brothers

A drama series of 100 episodes, written by Liwaa Yazji and Mohammad Abou Laban. Broadcast first in 2014 on Abu Dhabi TV channel and then distributed all over pan-Arab channels.

Haunted

A full-length documentary that Yazji wrote, produced and directed, released in 2014. It was supported by a fund from the Heinrich Boell Foundation. The film takes the viewer on a surreal journey through the lives of nine individuals who are either internally displaced in Syria or seeking refuge in Lebanon.

It won the Special Mention award at its premiere in the Marseille Festival of Documentary Film in 2014 and the Al Waha Bronze at the GIGAF festival in Tunisia 2016. The film also toured other international festivals and was released in selected cinemas.

Goats

A surrealist play about villagers receiving a goat from local mayor in compensation for their sons who died in the civil war. Translated into English in 2017 by Katharine Halls and after a first staged reading during the event "Told From the Inside" at the Royal Court Theatre, London, in 2016, it premiered in the same venue in December 2017. Goats was also part of PEN World Voices: International Play Festival 2018, New York, and a staged reading was produced at Khashabi Theatre in Haifa, in winter 2019.

Q & Q

A play on the debate of giving birth under conditions of violence, commissioned by the Royal Exchange Theatre in Manchester. The play had a staged reading in the Birth Festival in 2016. It was also part of the International Women Playwright Conference in Chile 2018, and the Edinburgh International Festival 2017, where staged readings held in theaters, academies and health institutions.

Waiting for the guests

A short play first published in Index on Censorship magazine in 2018. It portrays a woman persecuted by the state because of her writings. Thus, she is left with the difficult choice to either be killed by soldiers or to kill herself and her family before the soldiers arrive.

Collaborations

Second-hand body

A project curated by the Dancing on the Edge Festival in Amsterdam 2019, where Yazji's poetic monologue " Apples of my grandmother" by Yazji was presented.

Kashash

Curated by Alma Salem in 2017, the Syrian Sixth Space curatorial platform gathered 22 Syrian cultural leaders, currently resident in 10 countries around the world: Canada, The United States of America, Germany, France, The U.K, Turkey, Lebanon, UAE, The Netherlands and Syria. These cultural leaders included artists, intellectuals, journalists, researchers, software technicians, and public speakers. Taking place in The Netherlands they publicly presented a multi-dimensional space inspired and informed by the Syrian Kashash (trans.: pigeon breeders) tradition. Yazji participated with a story titled " The birds of longing".

Reveal

An "active reality adventure", set in Kings's Lynn town, December 2018. Yazji participated with her lyrical poem Maya`s Story, set to music by British composer Sandy Nuttgens, with images by Joe Magee and performed by Becky Banatvala.

Songs for days to come

Musical and poetic project, featuring Syrian musicians Kinan Azmeh, Dima Orsho, and cellist Kinan Abou-Afach, as well as pianist Lenore Davis, and poets Lukman Derky, Mohammad Abou-Laban, Liwaa Yazji and others. Yazji's participation was called A Glimpse.

Windows of the soul - Story of Syria

A film directed by Allyth Hajjo and Ammar Alani. 2010/2011, Syria, with Yazji as assistant director.

September rain

A film directed by Syrian filmmaker Abdellatif Abdelhamid in 2009/2010. Yazji played a role in the film.

Ongoing projects

Trash

This project received a Fellowship Grant for non-German-speaking authors in Berlin in 2018.

Heim

Supported by the Doha Film Institute Grant for Series Development 2019 Yazji co-wrote the script of a TV series called Heim (German for home or shelter), which deals with the life of refugees in Tempelhof Heim in Berlin. The film was selected to be part of the Qumra Film Market in Doha 2020.

References

Further reading 

 
 Dubois, Simon (2018). Négocier son identité artistique dans l’exil. Les recompositions d’un paysage créatif syrien à Berlin, Migrations Société, 2018/4 (N° 174), p. 45-57. DOI : 10.3917/migra.174.0045. (in French)

External links 

 
 Liwaa Yazji's short play Waiting for the guests (introduction and full text in English)
 Trailer for Liwaa Yazji's film Haunted on YouTube (Syrian Arabic with German subtitles)
 Interview with Liwaa Yazji about shooting her film Haunted

Syrian women
1977 births
Living people
Syrian dramatists and playwrights
Syrian film directors
Syrian women film directors
Syrian poets
People from Damascus
21st-century Syrian women writers
21st-century Syrian writers